Littlejohn may refer to:

People
 Adrian Littlejohn (born 1970), a British footballer
Agnes Littlejohn (1865–1944), Australian writer
 Alan Littlejohn (1929–1996), a British musician
 Charles Philip Littlejohn (1923–2014), Clerk of the New Zealand House of Representatives
 De Witt Clinton Littlejohn (1818–1892), an American politician and Union Army brigadier general
 Hawk Littlejohn, (1941–2000), a flute maker
 Henry Littlejohn (1826–1914), surgeon and instigator of Public Health concepts in UK 
 Jack Littlejohn (born 1991), Australian Rugby League player
 Jimmy Littlejohn (1910–1989), a British sportsman
 John Littlejohn (1931–1994), an American electric blues slide guitarist
 Kenneth Littlejohn (born c. 1941), a convicted armed robber and self-proclaimed double agent
 Raymond Littlejohns (1893–1961), an Australian ornithologist and accountant
 Richard Littlejohn (born 1954), a British journalist

Fictional characters
 William Harper Littlejohn, a fictional character in the Doc Savage universe
 Bel Littlejohn, a character created by British satirist Craig Brown
 Littlejohn, a novel by Howard Owen.

Other uses
 Littlejohn's tree frog, a species frog in Australia
 Littlejohn adaptor, a military tank weapon accessory
 Littlejohn Vase, a British sports trophy
 Littlejohn Coliseum, an arena in Clemson, South Carolina, US

See also
 Little John (disambiguation)